Gilvan Gomes Vieira, aka Esquerdinha (born 9 April 1984) is a Brazilian footballer who plays for Bragantino-PA as a left winger.

Playing career
Gilvan played with the União Recreativa dos Trabalhadores and Atlético Mineiro in Brazil. In 2005, he had a fleeting passage through the Georgian football with Dinamo Tbilisi. With the Georgian Zestafoni had continuity and showed a high level. In 2008, he played the Europa League first qualifying round. In 2009, he played in the first Korean league. In the market for the 2009-10 winter spent two weeks doing a trial. The club told him that he would respond at a time, and therefore the player went to Bosnia to sign for a club. But he received the call affirmative Huesca. With Huesca gave a good level on the Spanish second level. Sergio Fernandez, director of sports of Hércules CF, marked his signing as a priority in the summer of 2011, but the agreement broke down the high pretensions of Huesca and being Hércules judicial intervened. In the winter transfer of this season, Hércules returned in their interest and achieved the signing of 150,000 euros transfer with a contract for 2 seasons and a half.

References

External links 
 
 
 Futbolme profile  
 

1984 births
Living people
Sportspeople from Maranhão
Brazilian footballers
Association football wingers
União Recreativa dos Trabalhadores players
Clube Atlético Mineiro players
FC Dinamo Tbilisi players
FC Zestafoni players
Jeju United FC players
SD Huesca footballers
Hércules CF players
SD Eibar footballers
Clube do Remo players
Campeonato Brasileiro Série A players
Erovnuli Liga players
K League 1 players
Segunda División players
Super League Greece players
Campeonato Brasileiro Série C players
Campeonato Brasileiro Série D players
Brazilian expatriate footballers
Brazilian expatriate sportspeople in Georgia (country)
Brazilian expatriate sportspeople in South Korea
Brazilian expatriate sportspeople in Spain
Brazilian expatriate sportspeople in Greece
Expatriate footballers in Georgia (country)
Expatriate footballers in South Korea
Expatriate footballers in Spain
Expatriate footballers in Greece